Dimuthu Bandara Abayakoon (born September 6, 1971) is a Sri Lankan politician, belonging to the Janatha Vimukthi Peramuna. In the 2004 election he was elected as a representative of Kandy District in the Parliament of Sri Lanka, standing as a United People's Freedom Alliance candidate. He resides in Kandy. He is an alumnus of Dharmaraja College.

References

Alumni of Dharmaraja College
1971 births
Living people
Sri Lankan Buddhists
Members of the 12th Parliament of Sri Lanka
Members of the 13th Parliament of Sri Lanka
Janatha Vimukthi Peramuna politicians
United People's Freedom Alliance politicians
Politicians from Kandy